Agios Stefanos railway station  is a station on the Piraeus–Platy railway line in the northern part of the Athens urban area, in the municipality of Agios Stefanos, Greece. It was inaugurated on 8 March 1904 and reopened on 6 May 2005. It is owned by OSE, but service are provided by Hellenic Train, through the Athens Suburban Railway from Athens to Chalcis. The station was the setting for 1954 Greek film Neither Cat nor Damage, starring Vasilis Logothetidis.

History
The Station opened on 8 March 1904, as Bogiati railway station or as Vogiati railway station, the information is not that clear, in what was then the Central Greece on what was a branch line of the Piraeus, Demerli & Frontiers Railway. The name derived from a common name of the settlement of Agios Stefanos. In 1920 the station and most of the standard gauge railways in Greece came under the control of the Hellenic State Railways (SEK). It was renamed to Oion railway station at some point during this period. In 1924 the settlement's name was changed to Agios Stefanos, however the railway station continued to be called Oion 

During the Axis occupation of Greece (1941–44), Athens was controlled by German military fourses, and the line used for the transport of troops and weapons. During the occupation (and especially during German withdrawal in 1944), the network was severely damaged by both the German army and Greek resistance groups. The track and rolling stock replacement took time following the civil war, with normal service levels resumed around 1948. The station (then still known as Oion railway station) was the cinematic setting for "Thymaria train station" in the 1954 Greek film Neither Cat nor Damage, starring Vasilis Logothetidis.
In 1970 OSE became the legal successor to the SEK, taking over responsibilities for most of Greece's rail infrastructure. On 1 January 1971 the station, and most of the Greek rail infrastructure was transferred to the Hellenic Railways Organisation S.A., a state-owned corporation. The line was converted to diesel sometime before 1990. The station was remanded to Agios Stefanos 1 August 1981. Freight traffic declined sharply when the state-imposed monopoly of OSE for the transport of agricultural products and fertilisers ended in the early 1990s. Many small stations of the network with little passenger traffic were closed down.

In 2001 the infrastructure element of OSE was created, known as GAIAOSE, it would henceforth be responsible for the maintenance, of stations, bridges and other elements of the network, as well as the leasing and the sale of railway assists. In 2003, OSE launched "Proastiakos SA", as a subsidiary to serve the operation of the suburban network in the urban complex of Athens during the 2004 Olympic Games. In 2005, TrainOSE was created as a brand within OSE to concentrate on rail services and passenger interface. In 2008, all Athens Suburban Railway services were transferred from OSE to TrainOSE. The station was reopened on 6 May 2005. The following year its name changed again to its current form in 2006.

In 2009, with the Greek debt crisis unfolding OSE's Management was forced to reduce services across the network. Timetables were cutback and routes closed, as the government-run entity attempted to reduce overheads. In 2017 OSE's passenger transport sector was privatised as TrainOSE, currently, a wholly-owned subsidiary of Ferrovie dello Stato Italiane infrastructure, including stations, remained under the control of OSE. That same year on 30 July Line 3 of the Athens Suburban Railway began serving the station.

Facilities
The ground-level station is assessed via stairs or a ramp. It has two side platforms, with the main station buildings located on the eastbound platform, these are however now inaccessible and partially rundown, with access to the platforms via stairs or lifts. The Station is housed in the original stone-built station is closed. a cafe 'The Station' is located in an adjacent building. At platform level, there are sheltered seating and Dot-matrix display departure and arrival screens and timetable poster boards on both platforms. There is a large car park next to the westbound platforms, open from 06:00-19:30 daily. Outside the station, there is a bus stop where the local 509, 535 & 535 A call.

Services

Since 15 May 2022, the following weekday services call at this station:

Future
In 2006, plans were published to expand Athens Metro Line 1 (Then ISAP) of the Athens Metro from Kifisia to Agios Stefanos ωστόσο έκτοτε δεν προχώρησε το έργο. Since that date, however little progress has been made on these proposals.

Station layout

Gallery

See also
Railway stations in Greece
Hellenic Railways Organization
Hellenic Train
Proastiakos
P.A.Th.E./P.

References

External links
 Agios Stefanos railway station - National Railway Network Greek Travel Pages

Dionysos, Greece
Attica
Buildings and structures in Attica
Transport in Attica
Railway stations in Attica
Railway stations opened in 1904
Railway stations opened in 2005